Sychevo is a rural locality (a village) in Yugskoye Rural Settlement, Cherepovetsky District, Vologda Oblast, Russia. The population was 18 as of 2002.

Geography 
Sychevo is located 53 km southeast of Cherepovets (the district's administrative centre) by road. Aksenovo is the nearest rural locality.

References 

Rural localities in Cherepovetsky District